Kreodanthus is a small genus of orchids (family Orchidaceae) belonging to the subfamily Orchidoideae.

It is native to Cuba and Southern Mexico to Peru.

Species  
Kreodanthus casillasii R.González (1995) (Mexico, El Salvador)
Kreodanthus corniculatus (Rchb.f.) Garay (1977) (Cuba)
Kreodanthus crispifolius Garay (1978) (Ecuador, Peru)
Kreodanthus ecuadorensis Garay (1987) (Ecuador)
Kreodanthus elatus (L.O.Williams) Garay (1977) (Venezuela)
Kreodanthus loxoglottis (Rchb.f.) Garay (1977) (Guatemala)
Kreodanthus myrmex Ormerod  (2005) (Colombia)
Kreodanthus ovatilabius (Ames & Correll) Garay (1977) (Mexico, Guatemala)
Kreodanthus rotundifolius Ormerod  (2005) (Amazonas - Peru) 
Kreodanthus secundus (Ames) Garay (1977) (Mexico, El Salvador)
Kreodanthus simplex (C.Schweinf.) Garay (1977) (Peru)

References 

 Orchid Research Newsletter 47 (January 2006) - Royal Botanical Gardens, Kew.

Goodyerinae
Cranichideae genera